Epidesma similis is a moth of the subfamily Arctiinae. It was described by Rothschild in 1912. It is found in Brazil.

The wingspan is 40 mm. The forewings are black-brown with a broad oblique yellow band. The hindwings are black-brown.

References

 Natural History Museum Lepidoptera generic names catalog

Epidesma
Moths described in 1912